Leptolobium is a small Neotropical genus of plants in the family Fabaceae, with ten species currently recognized. With the exception of Leptolobium panamense, which occurs in tropical forests from northwestern South America to Mexico, all species of Leptolobium are restricted to South America and most diverse in Brazil. Most Leptolobium species have been traditionally included in Acosmium Schott (Fabaceae), but both genera have been recently distinguished based on several vegetative and reproductive traits.

Species 
Leptolobium comprises the following species:
Section Leptolobium (Vogel) Yakovlev
Leptolobium araguaiense Sch.Rodr. & A.M.G. Azevedo
Leptolobium dasycarpum Vogel
Leptolobium elegans Vogel
Leptolobium glaziovianum (Harms) Sch.Rodr. & A.M.G.Azevedo
Leptolobium multijugum Sch.Rodr. & A.M.G. Azevedo
Leptolobium nitens Vogel
Leptolobium panamense (Benth.) Sch.Rodr. & A.M.G. Azevedo
Leptolobium parvifolium (Harms) Sch.Rodr. & A.M.G. Azevedo
Leptolobium stirtonii (G.A. Aymard & V. González) Sch. Rodr. & A.M.G
Leptolobium tenuifolium Vogel
Section Mesitis (Vogel) Yakovlev
Leptolobium bijugum Vogel
Leptolobium brachystachyum(Benth.) Sch.Rodr. & A.M.G. Azevedo

References 

Leptolobieae
Fabaceae genera